The 2016 Rugby Europe Under-18 Sevens Championship was hosted by Romania in Bucharest from 17–18 September. Ireland won the Championship after beating France 31–5 in the final.

Teams

Pool stages

Pool A

Pool B

Pool C

Finals 
Cup Quarterfinals

Plate Semifinals

Bowl Semifinals

Final standings

References 

2021
2016 rugby sevens competitions
2016 in European sport
Rugby Europe Under-18